Sean Cameron may refer to:

 Sean Cameron (Degrassi character)
 Sean Cameron (footballer)